Donna Traynor is a journalist and broadcaster in Northern Ireland. Born in Lisburn, she is best known as the former main anchor of BBC Newsline.

Broadcasting career
Traynor has been nominated twice by the Royal Television Society awards for the Presenter of the Year category. She began her career in broadcasting at RTÉ in Dublin.

Traynor joined the BBC in 1989. She presented news bulletins on BBC Radio Ulster, and was on air when news broke of the Provisional IRA ceasefire in August 1994. Around this time, Traynor began reading television news bulletins, and was later promoted to the position of main anchor on BBC Newsline.

In addition to her news work, Traynor also presented Country Times, various educational programmes and coverage of the Balmoral Show for BBC Northern Ireland, along with local coverage of Children in Need.

Resigned From The BBC 
On 15 November 2021, it was announced that Traynor had resigned from BBC Northern Ireland with immediate effect after 33 years at the corporation. In a statement, Traynor said she could not comment on the circumstances surrounding her departure, due to an ongoing employment tribunal, among other legal proceedings.

Personal life
Traynor was born in Lisburn, but moved to Dublin with her family as a child. Educated at Loreto Convent, Bray, she studied journalism at university in Dublin (NIHE, now Dublin City University) and in Preston, Lancashire.

Traynor is deaf in one ear. She is married to Ronan Kelly, a training consultant and fellow broadcaster. She lives in Belfast.

References

External links
 Meet The Team - Donna Traynor, BBC Newsline, 21 April 2008

Alumni of Dublin City University
BBC newsreaders and journalists
Irish television presenters
Irish women journalists
Irish women television presenters
Living people
People from Lisburn
Year of birth missing (living people)